Krishna Das (born Jeffrey Kagel; May 31, 1947) is an American vocalist known for his performances of Hindu devotional music known as kirtan (chanting the names of God). He has released seventeen albums since 1996. He performed at the 2013 Grammy Awards, where his album Live Ananda (2012) was nominated for the 2013 Grammy Award for Best New Age Album. He's been described by the New York Times as "the chant master of American yoga".

Biography
In June 1967, a small group of high school and college students on Long Island formed a rock band that would eventually become Blue Öyster Cult. For a brief time, Jeff Kagel, then a student at State University of New York at Stony Brook, was the band's lead singer, but he quit.

In August 1970 Krishna Das traveled to India, where, as Ram Dass had done, he became a devotee of the Hindu guru Neem Karoli Baba (Maharaj-ji).

He was referred to as the "Rockstar of Yoga" by the Grammys when he was nominated for a 2013 Grammy Award.

Krishna Das has been associated with many other artists. Two of his albums have featured Hans Christian as a guest multi-instrumentalist, and Sting appears on the album Pilgrim Heart. He has also appeared on an album with Baird Hersey & Prana, a group combining Western music and overtone singing, entitled Gathering in the Light. Walter Becker of Steely Dan plays bass guitar on and co-produced All One (2010), which also features Rick Allen of Def Leppard on drums and Steve Gorn on flute. Ty Burhoe plays tabla on several albums. Rick Rubin produced Breath of the Heart.

His album Live Ananda (2012) was nominated for the 2013 Grammy Award for Best New Age Album. He performed at the Grammy Awards ceremony as well.

In April 2014 his album Kirtan Wallah was released under his own label Krishna Das Music.

In 2014, Krishna Das helped to form the Kirtan Wallah Foundation, a 501c3 nonprofit, dedicated to spreading the teachings of his spiritual teacher, Neem Karoli Baba.

Anusara Yoga invocation
Krishna Das composed the melody for an Anusara Yoga invocation, Om Nama Shivaya Gurave, at the request of John Friend, founder of Anusara Yoga. Friend describes this composition as being written during a summer night at a secluded mountain retreat center in Utah in 1998.

Zen Peacemakers chant
In the early 2000s Bernie Glassman founder of Zen Peacemakers asked Krishna Das to compose a melody for the chant Gates of Sweet Nectar, a traditional Japanese buddhist chant that had been translated to English by Glassman. After composing a melody Krishna Das realised it would work well with the Hanuman Chalisa both melodically and lyrically since the former is a desire to offer ones heart and the latter gives strength to follow through on a task.

Discography

 1996: One Track Heart
 1998: Pilgrim Heart
 2000: Live... on Earth
 2001: Breath of the Heart
 2001: Pilgrim of the Heart
 2003: Door of Faith
 2004: Greatest Hits of the Kali Yuga
 2005: All One
 2007: Gathering in the Light with Baird Hersey & Prana
 2007: Flow of Grace: Chanting the Hanuman Chalisa
 2008: Heart Full of Soul
 2010: Heart as Wide as the World
 2012: Live Ananda
 2014: Kirtan Wallah
 2015: Laughing at the Moon
 2017: Trust in the Heart
 2018: Peace of My Heart

Books
 Flow of Grace: Chanting the Hanuman Chalisa, Sounds True, 2007. 100 pages. .
 Chants of a Lifetime: Searching for a Heart of Gold, by Krishna Das. Hay House, Inc, 2010. . (Memoir)

Other appearances
 Open to the Infinite: Live at the Inner Directions Gathering (video), with Ram Dass, Bertram Salzman, Matthew Greenblatt. Inner Directions, 1999. .

Documentary

In 2011 and 2012, a documentary was made about Krishna Das called One Track Heart: The Story of Krishna Das. It was directed by filmmaker Jeremy Frindel and features interviews with Krishna Das and others commenting on his life and spiritual quest. In late 2012 the documentary was picked up by distributor Zeitgeist Films for US distribution, and it came out in the US in May 2013. The soundtrack includes tracks by Krishna Das and the film score by J Mascis and Devadas.

Money laundering
In 2002, Krishna Das pled guilty to a federal charge of money laundering and was sentenced to three years' probation and six months' house arrest. In a 2013 interview the singer recounted how he had introduced some old friends who imported hashish to a banker, and many years later was contacted by the FBI regarding the matter. Krishna Das has described the experience as "one of the most liberating experiences of my life... I don't have to keep any secrets anymore".

Notes

References

External links
 
 
 Krishna Das at last.fm
 Krishna Das Yoga Radio at SiriusXM
"If music be the food of love, play on" an interview with Ascent magazine
Krishna Das, Bhakti Yogi, 2007 interview at Satchidananda Ashram, Yogaville, VA

American male singer-songwriters
American Hindus
Converts to Hinduism
Jewish American musicians
Living people
1947 births
Harmonium players
Bhajan singers
American male composers
21st-century American composers
People from Long Island
Record producers from New York (state)
Performers of Hindu music
Kirtan performers
21st-century American male musicians
American singer-songwriters
21st-century American Jews
End Hits Records artists